Villaflores may refer to:
 Villaflores, Chiapas, a municipality in the state of Chiapas, Mexico;
 Villaflores, Guadalajara, a hamlet in the municipality of Guadalajara, Spain;
 Villaflores, Salamanca, a municipality in the province of Salamanca, Castile and León, Spain.